Samuel Western (3 August 1652 – 20 August 1699) was an English politician who sat in the House of Commons from 1689 to 1698.

Biography
Western was the son of Thomas Western of Rivenhall Essex and his wife Martha Gott daughter of Samuel Gott. His father was a merchant and councillor of the city of London who had considerable interests in iron in the area of Winchelsea. Western was a member of Gray's Inn.

Western was elected Member of Parliament (MP) for Winchelsea on 17 January 1689 and held the seat until 1698. Western married Anna Maria Finch and had a family. He died of consumption at Rivenhall aged 47.

References

1652 births
1699 deaths
English MPs 1689–1690
English MPs 1690–1695
English MPs 1695–1698
Members of Gray's Inn
17th-century deaths from tuberculosis
Tuberculosis deaths in England